Hill v. Wallace, 259 U.S. 44 (1922), was a U.S. Supreme Court decision overturning the legality of the Futures Trading Act of 1921. The law, approved August 24, 1921, by the U.S. Congress attempted to institute Federal regulation of grain futures contract trading by imposing a prohibitive tax on futures contracts traded on any market other than those that met the statute's requirements and were regulated by the Secretary of Agriculture. The court found it was an unconstitutional exercise of the taxing power of Congress. Congress responded to the Court's decision by passing the Grain Futures Act in September 1922 based on the Commerce Clause. The Grain Futures Act was held to be constitutional by the Court in Board of Trade of City of Chicago v. Olsen (1923)

See also
List of United States Supreme Court cases, volume 259

References

External links
 
 

United States Supreme Court cases
United States Supreme Court cases of the Taft Court
United States taxation and revenue case law
United States commodity and futures case law
1922 in United States case law